Santa Maria Maggiore is a church in Lomello, province of Pavia, Lombardy, Italy, an example of First Romanesque art. It includes the oldest cross vaults in Italy.

The oldest document mentioning the basilica  is a privilege by pope Paschal II, dated 22 August 1107. Archaeological studies showed that at least two churches existed in the site before the current one, the earliest one being perhaps contemporary to the annexed baptistery of San Giovanni ad Fontes (c. 5th-7th centuries). The basilica  has a nave and two aisles with a lower transept. The façade was originally embedded in the city's walls, but later the first three bays were abandoned and a new façade was obtained by closing one of the internal arches with a new wall.

The nave is characterized by arches which, at the sides, have double mullioned windows at the sides. The pillars which do not support the arches are prolonged by  blind columns up to the clerestory. The longitudinal arches (those separating the nave from the aisles) are supported by semicolumns which form the pillars. The aisles are a 14th-century reconstruction of the original ones. In 1944   a crypt, perhaps unfinished, was discovered.

Adejacent to the basilica is the nearly coeval Baptistery of San Giovanni ad Fontes.

Sources

External links
Page on the municipal website 

Churches in the province of Pavia
Romanesque architecture in Lombardy
Basilica churches in Lombardy
12th-century Roman Catholic church buildings in Italy